One Last Afternoon (Spanish: La última tarde) is a 2016 Peruvian-Colombian drama film written and directed by Joel Calero. It stars Katherine D'onofrio and Lucho Cáceres.

Synopsis 
A young marriage, founded on idealistic causes, breaks with the structures that traditional society imposes. The confrontation with the family and the most intimate environment drives a new life. Everything is going well until one day she disappears. 19 years later they meet again and the appointment is stormed by questions, fears and frustrations.

Cast 
The actors participating in this film are:

 Katherine D'onofrio as Laura
 Lucho Cáceres as Ramon
 Pold Gastello
 Juan Carlos Arango

Release 
One Last Afternoon was commercially released in Lima on April 27, 2017; it had previously been released at the 2016 Lima Film Festival.

Awards

References

External links 

 

2016 films
2016 drama films
Peruvian drama films
Colombian drama films
2010s Spanish-language films
2010s Peruvian films
Films set in Peru
Films shot in Peru
Films about divorce
Films about terrorism
2010s Colombian films